, , or AMU, is a national university and medical school in Asahikawa, Hokkaido, Japan. Established in 1973, the university has one faculty, Faculty of Medicine, consisting of Department of Medicine and Department of Nursing. The affiliated Asahikawa Medical University Hospital was established in 1976.

History 

The precursor of Asahikawa Medical University was the  founded in Yuzhno-Sakhalinsk in 1943. After World War II, Karahuto Medical College was closed down because the nearby island of Sakhalin was occupied by the Union of Soviet Socialist Republics Red Army. The Asahikawa city government applied to the Supreme Commander of the Allied Powers and the Ministry of Education, Science, Sports and Culture (now the Ministry of Education, Culture, Sports, Science and Technology) for relocation of the medical college to Asahikawa, but they were rejected.

After the rejection, the Hokkaido government planned to form medical schools in both Asahikawa and Kushiro in order to address the shortage of physicians in Hokkaido. In 1973, Asahikawa Medical College (旭川医科大学) was established, with an educational philosophy of 
. At first, the college had only one department: Medicine. Without a campus of its own, it was located within the Hokkaido University of Education campus. AMU moved into its original campus in 1975. In 1996, the department of Nursing Science was founded and in 2010, the college was renamed to the Asahikawa Medical University. AMU has become the core medical university in Hokkaido with many physicians from AMU working in the local community.

Presidents
There were two presidents of the Karahuto Medical College. There have been seven presidents of Asahikawa Medical University, including the current president, Professor Akitoshi Yoshida, who has been in office since 2007.

Karahuto Medical College presidents

Asahikawa Medical University presidents

Campus 

The campus is located in Asahikawa. The campus is divided into four areas: lecture and practice area, clinical lecture area, laboratory area, and hospital area. Each areas are connected by a hallway enough so people travel between the areas in cold weather.

Asahikawa Medical University Hospital
The Asahikawa Medical University Hospital was founded in 1976 as a teaching hospital for AMU. It has 602 beds, and becomes one of the core hospitals in the northern and southern area in Hokkaido.

There have been eight presidents of the AMU hospital, including the current president, Professor Takeo Matsuno, who has been in office since 2007.

Asahikawa Medical University Library
The Asahikawa Medical University library was founded in 1978. It currently has about 160,000 prints of books and journals, and 10,000 digital resources. These resources include not only about medical but also about education, mathematics, and other liberal arts.

Faculties and graduate schools
AMU has one faculty with two departments and six centers.

Departments

Department of Medicine
Department of Nursing

Centers
 Center of Education
 Center of University Health
 Center of Parental Care
 Center of Labware
 Center of Data processing
 Center of telemedicine

Partner universities
AMU has partnerships with eight universities.
 Hokkaido College of Pharmacy
 Kitami Institute of Technology
 Japanese Red Cross Hokkaido College of Nursing
 Nanjing University of Traditional Chinese Medicine
 China Medical University
 Harbin Medical University
 Mahidol University
 Udayana University

See also
 Japanese national university
 List of medical schools in Asia

References

External links
 AMU Official website
 AMU Hospital
 AMU Library

Educational institutions established in 1973
Japanese national universities
Medical schools in Japan
Nursing schools in Japan
Universities and colleges in Hokkaido
1973 establishments in Japan
Buildings and structures in Asahikawa